"Make It Funky" is a jam session recorded by James Brown with The J.B.'s. It was released as a two-part single in 1971, which reached No. 1 on the U.S. R&B chart and No. 22 on the U.S. Pop chart.

Publication
This was his first song to be submitted solely to Polydor Records. The original master is very slow and steadily formed in tempo, compared to how it is performed live. It features the band members chanting the song's title and a prominent organ part played by Brown himself. Bobby Byrd also contributes vocals and a spoken intro. Brown released the next 6 minutes of the recording as another two-part single, titled  "My Part/Make It Funky", which charted #68 R&B. Parts 3 and 4 appeared on the album Get on the Good Foot.

Live versions of "Make It Funky" appear on the albums Revolution of the Mind and Live at the Apollo 1995. Brown also remade the song for his 1992 album Universal James under the title "Make It Funky 2000".

The full version, running 12:50, was released on the compilation Make It Funky – The Big Payback: 1971–1975 in 1996.

Sample used
Audio Two - Make It Funky
Ice-T - Make It Funky (1987)
Marley Marl - Droppin' Science
Slum Village - I Don't Know
 Kingdom - Every Beat Of My Heart

Recognition
In 2005, the bassline to all four parts was ranked at number 2 in Stylus Magazine'''s list of the "Top 50 Basslines of All Time".

Personnel
 James Brown - lead vocal, organwith The J.B.'s:''
	
 Jerone "Jasaan" Sanford - trumpet, vocals
 Russell Crimes - trumpet, vocals
 Fred Wesley - trombone, vocals
 St. Clair Pinckney - tenor saxophone, vocals
 Hearlon "Cheese" Martin - guitar, vocals
 Robert Lee Coleman - guitar, vocals
 Fred Thomas - bass, vocals
 John "Jabo" Starks - drums, vocals
 Bobby Byrd - vocals
 Martha Harvin - vocals

References

External links
 [ Song Review] from Allmusic

1971 singles
James Brown songs
Songs written by James Brown
1971 songs
Polydor Records singles